Simon Denis Brown, Baron Brown of Eaton-under-Heywood, PC (born 9 April 1937) is a British barrister and former Law Lord and Justice of the Supreme Court of the United Kingdom, from 2009 to 2012.

Early life
The son of Denis Baer Brown and Edna Elizabeth Brown (née Abrahams), Brown was born in 1937 into a middle class Jewish family from Sheffield. He received his formal education at Stowe School from 1950-1955, where he acquired a passion for history, winning the school’s top history prize.  Brown had passed his entrance exam to read history at Worcester College, Oxford University, but he was first required to undertake mandatory National Service (1955-1957).

Brown attended eight weeks gruelling basic training with the Royal Artillery near Oswestry, followed by officer training near Aldershot, and was commissioned on 24 March 1956 as a second lieutenant, temporarily stationed in Essex.    The following month, Brown embarked for Malta but was diverted to Cyprus at the outbreak of hostilities in Suez.  Preparations for engagement in Suez never materialised as British forces became absorbed into conflict against Greek Cypriot right-wing nationalist guerrilla organisation (EOKA) fighting for  the unification of Cyprus and Greece.  

Brown returned to Essex in the Spring of 1957 and was transferred to the Regular Army Reserves of Officers on 29 July 1957, thereby ending his active service. He decided to take his first long summer vacation in New York, stacking shelves in the basement of a 5th Avenue department store in the day and mixing with the "great and the good" of New York in the evenings.

At the end of the summer break, Brown joined the intake of 1957 to Oxford, which was dominated by students coming out of two years of national service with little or no thought of academic study.  Brown had come up to Oxford to read history but by May 1958, he changed to law with his sights set on the Middle Temple.  Term time for Brown was devoted to the study of law and jurisprudence but the long summer vacations were given over to backpacking around post-war Europe, or earning money as a tour-guide for wealthy (mostly trans-Atlantic) travellers.

After three years, Brown graduated from Oxford, and was called to the bar by the Middle Temple in February 1961.

Legal career
From 1979 to 1984, he was a Recorder and First Junior Treasury Counsel (Common Law). From 1980, he was a Master of the Bench of the Middle Temple.

Judicial career
Brown was appointed a High Court Judge in 1984 and assigned to the Queen's Bench Division, receiving a knighthood on his appointment. He became a Lord Justice of Appeal, a judge of the Court of Appeal of England and Wales, in 1992 and was made a Privy Counsellor in the same year. He was vice-president of the Civil Division from 2001 to 2003.

On 13 January 2004, he was appointed a Lord of Appeal in Ordinary, and therefore became a life peer with the title Baron Brown of Eaton-under-Heywood, of Eaton-under-Heywood in the County of Shropshire, sitting as a crossbencher. He and nine other Lords of Appeal in Ordinary became Justices of the Supreme Court upon that body's inauguration on 1 October 2009.

Personal life
He has been married to Jennifer Buddicom since 31 May 1963; they have two sons and one daughter (Benedict, Daniel and Abigail) and five grandchildren.

References and notes

Notes

1937 births
British Jews
People educated at Stowe School
Alumni of Worcester College, Oxford
Royal Artillery officers
20th-century English judges
Brown of Eaton-under-Heywood 
Members of the Middle Temple
English King's Counsel
Members of the Privy Council of the United Kingdom
British people of German-Jewish descent
British people of Jewish descent
Queen's Bench Division judges
Members of the Judicial Committee of the Privy Council
Judges of the Supreme Court of the United Kingdom
Knights Bachelor
Crossbench life peers
Living people
Lords Justices of Appeal
21st-century English judges